Lars Erik Karlsson (born 28 October 1964) is a Swedish former professional darts player who competed in the British Darts Organisation (BDO) during the 1980s and 90s.

Career 
Karlsson played three successive World Championships in 1987, 1988 and 1989.  He reached the quarter finals in 1987, defeating Scotland's Peter McDonald in the first round and then defeated Brian Cairns in round two before losing to defending champion Eric Bristow. In 1988, he lost 3-0 in the first round to Paul Reynolds and in 1989, he defeated Tony Payne in the first round before losing to Peter Evison in round 2.

Karlsson played in the 1988 MFI World Pairs with Mike Gregory he lose to Jocky Wilson and Ritchie Gardner.

World Championship results

BDO 

 1987: Quarter Finals: (lost to Eric Bristow 1–4) (sets)
 1988: Last 32: (lost to Paul Reynolds 0–3)
 1989: Last 16: (lost to Peter Evison 0–3)

External links 
Profile and stats on Darts Database

Living people
Swedish darts players
British Darts Organisation players
1964 births